Morris is a surname of various origins though mostly of English, Irish, Scottish and Welsh origin. The surname ranked 53 out of 88,799 in the United States and 32 out of 500 in England and Wales.

Origins

Britain 
In England and Scotland, the name can be derived from the Old French personal name Maurice which was introduced to Britain by the Normans. It can also be derived from the Latin Mauritius, a derivative of Maurus. This name was used by several early Christian saints. Additionally the name Morris is of Anglo-Norman origin deriving from the "de Marisco" line (meaning "of the marsh" in modern English). In some instances the surnames Morris has been seen to derive from Morres, which is the plural topographical name for a "family living on the Morre" (moors). It is not a coincidence that the greatest concentration of the Morris name in England is found around Bolton-le-Moors, Lancashire; a county where topographical and place-name surnames dominate. In Wales, Morris is also found as a patronymic surname, deriving from meaning 'son of Morris'.

Ireland 
Ó Muiris and, less commonly, de Moiréis in Irish; the Morris surname in Ireland is predominantly of Norman origin. It comes from the Norman 'de Mareys', 'de Marreis' and Latin 'de Marisco', i.e., 'of the marsh'. It is a common surname in many parts of the south of Ireland, especially in Kilkenny, Tipperary, Offaly, Laois, Cork and Limerick, where it is now anglicised as Morris. A family of the name settled, in 1485, at Galway and became one of the Tribes of Galway. It may also refer to 'descendant of Muiris' (sea-choice), a variant of Ó Muireasa. This was the name of a branch of the Uí Fiachrach who were formerly chiefs of a district on the southern shore of Sligo Bay, in the barony of Tireragh.

Germany 
In some cases Morris is of German origin, as a variant of the German name Moritz.

Notable people with the surname "Morris"

Disambiguation of common given names with this surname

 Aaron Morris (disambiguation)
 Alan Morris (disambiguation)
 Albert Morris (disambiguation)
 Alexander Morris (disambiguation)
 Alfred Morris (disambiguation)
 Allan Morris (disambiguation)
 Allen Morris (disambiguation)
 Andrew Morris (disambiguation)
 Anne Morris (disambiguation)
 Anthony Morris (disambiguation)
 Arthur Morris (disambiguation)
 Ashley Morris (disambiguation)
 Benjamin Morris (disambiguation)
 Bert Morris (disambiguation)
 Brian Morris (disambiguation)
 Carl Morris (disambiguation)
 Charles Morris (disambiguation)
 Chris Morris (disambiguation)
 Colin Morris (disambiguation)
 Darryl Morris (disambiguation)
 David Morris (disambiguation)
 Dennis Morris (disambiguation)
 Derek Morris (disambiguation)
 Edmund Morris (disambiguation)
 Edward Morris (disambiguation), or Ed Morris
 Edwin Morris (disambiguation)
 Elisabeth Morris (disambiguation), or Elizabeth Morris
 Eric Morris (disambiguation)
 Frances Morris (disambiguation)
 Francis Morris (disambiguation)
 Frank Morris (disambiguation)
 Fred Morris (disambiguation)
 Geoffrey Morris (disambiguation)
 George Morris (disambiguation)
 Greg Morris (disambiguation)
 Harold Morris (disambiguation)
 Harry Morris (disambiguation)
 Henry Morris (disambiguation)
 Herbert Morris (disambiguation)
 Holly Morris (disambiguation)
 Hugh Morris (disambiguation)
 Ian Morris (disambiguation)
 Jack Morris (disambiguation)
 James Morris (disambiguation)
 Jeff Morris (disambiguation)
 Jenny Morris (disambiguation)
 Jim Morris (disambiguation)
 Joe Morris (disambiguation)
 Jonathan Morris (disambiguation)
 Jordan Morris (disambiguation)
 Joseph Morris (disambiguation)
 John Morris (disambiguation)
 Johnny Morris (disambiguation)
 Josh Morris (disambiguation)
 Keith Morris (disambiguation)
 Kenneth Morris (disambiguation)
 Kevin Morris (disambiguation)
 Lee Morris (disambiguation)
 Lewis Morris (disambiguation)
 Lynn Morris (disambiguation)
 Margaret Morris (disambiguation)
 Mark Morris (disambiguation)
 Martin Morris (disambiguation)
 Mary Morris (disambiguation)
 Matthew Morris (disambiguation)
 Michael Morris (disambiguation)
 Mike Morris (disambiguation)
 Niall Morris (disambiguation)
 Nicholas Morris (disambiguation)
 Pat Morris (disambiguation)
 Patrick Morris (disambiguation)
 Paul Morris (disambiguation)
 Peter Morris (disambiguation)
 Philip Morris (disambiguation)
 Raymond Morris (disambiguation)
 Ricardo Morris (disambiguation)
 Richard Morris (disambiguation)
 Rob Morris (disambiguation)
 Robert Morris (disambiguation)
 Roger Morris (disambiguation)
 Ron Morris (disambiguation)
 Russell Morris (disambiguation)
 Samuel Morris (disambiguation)
 Sarah Morris (disambiguation)
 Simon Morris (disambiguation)
 Steve Morris (disambiguation)
 Stephen Morris (disambiguation)
 Sylvia Morris (disambiguation)
 Terry Morris (disambiguation)
 Thomas Morris (disambiguation)
 Tom Morris (disambiguation)
 Trevor Morris (disambiguation)
 Wayne Morris (disambiguation)
 William Morris (disambiguation)

Arts and letters

 Adrian Morris (actor) (1907–1941), American stage and film actor
 Adrian Morris (1929–2004), English painter
 Agnes Thomas Morris (1865–1949), American writer and clubwoman
 Amos Morris (born 1987/1988), Australian country music bush balladeer
 Andrea Morris (born 1983), Canadian actress
 Anita Morris (1943–1994), American actress, singer and dancer
 Aubrey Morris (1926–2015), British actor 
 Audrey Morris (1928–2018), American jazz singer
 Bam Morris (Byron Morris; born 1972), American football running back
 Barboura Morris (1932–1975), American actress
 Burton Morris (born 1964), American pop artist
 Butch Morris (Lawrence D. Morris; 1947–2013), American cornetist, composer and conductor
 Carey Morris (1882–1968), Welsh painter, illustrator, author and businessman
 Carol Morris (born 1936), American actress, 5th Miss Universe (1956)
 Caroline Morris (born 1974), British voice actress
 Cassandra Lee Morris (born 1982), American voice actress
 Cedric Morris (1889–1982), British artist, art teacher and plantsman
 Mrs. Charles H. Morris, the married name of Lelia N. Morris (18621929), American hymnwriter
 Chester Morris (1901–1970), American stage, film, television, and radio actor
 Christiana Morris (1804–1886), Mi'kmaq quillworker
 Clara Morris (1849–1925), American actress
 Clint Morris, Australian entertainment writer, publicist and producer
 Craig Morris (born 1968), American orchestral trumpeter
 Danny Morris (music producer), American songwriter and record producer
 Dorothy Morris (1922–2011), American film and television actress
 Edita Morris (1902–1988), Swedish-American writer
 Edith Emily Morris (1895–1965), New Zealand jewellery designer and silversmith
 Elida Morris (later Elida Morris Cooper; 1886–1977), American vaudeville singer, comedian and actress
 Eliot Morris (born 1977), American singer, songwriter and musician
 Elliott Morris, British singer, songwriter and guitarist
 Ernest Morris (1913–1987), British film director
 Errol Morris (born 1948), American documentary film director
 Evelyn Morris (also known as Pikelet), Australian musician
 Flora Morris (born c. 1890), British stage and film actress
 Gareth Morris (1920–2007), British flautist
 Garrett Morris (born 1937), American actor and comedian
 Gary Morris (born 1948), American singer and stage actor
 Genevieve Morris (born 1967), Australian actress
 Geraint Morris (1941–1997), Welsh film and television director and producer
 Gerald Morris (born 1963), American writer of children's and young adult literature
 Gertrude Maesmore Morris (1872–1952), English-Australian actress
 Gilbert Morris (1929–2016), American Christian author
 Gouverneur Morris (novelist) (1876–1953), American author of pulp novels and short stories
 Haley Morris-Cafiero (born 1975/1976), American photographer
 Haviland Morris (born 1959), American film, television, and Broadway actress
 Heather Morris (born 1987), American actor
 Hilda Grossman Morris (1911–1991), American sculptor of the Northwest School
 Howard Morris (1919–2005), American actor, voice actor and director
 Iain Morris (born 1973), English screenwriter, creator of the British sitcom The Inbetweeners
 Ieuan Morris, British art photographer
 Iona Morris (born 1957), American actress
 Irvin Morris (born 1958), Navajo Nation author
 Ishan Morris (also known as iSH), Canadian actor and singer
 Islwyn Morris (1920–2011), Welsh-speaking actor and director
 J. Madison Wright Morris (also known as J. Madison Wright; 1984–2006), American actress
 Jackie Morris (born 1961), British writer and illustrator
 Jan Morris (born 1926), British historian, author, travel writer
 Jane Alice Morris (also known as Jenny Morris; 1861–1935), British embroiderer
 Janet Morris (born 1946), American author
 Jay Hunter Morris (born 1963), American operatic tenor
 Jeremiah Morris (Jerome Maurice Gomberg; 1929–2006), American actor, television and theater director
 Jessica Morris, American actress
 Joan Morris (born 1943), American mezzo-soprano
 Joel Morris, British comedy writer
 Judy Morris (Judith Ann Morris; born 1947), Australian actress, film director and screenwriter
 Julia Morris (born 1968), Australian comedian, actress, writer, television presenter and producer
 Julian Morris (born 1983), English-American actor
 Julianne Morris (born 1968), American actress
 Karen Joy Morris aka Karen Mok (born 1970), Hong Kong actor and singer-songwriter
 Karen Morris-Gowdy (born 1956), American actress
 Katherine Faw Morris (also known as Katherine Faw; born 1983), American writer
 Kathleen Morris (1893–1986), Canadian painter, member of the Beaver Hall Group
 Kathryn Morris (born 1969), American actress
 Kendra Morris (born 1981), American soul singer-songwriter
 Lamar Morris, American country music singer and musician
 Lamorne Morris (born 1983), American actor
 Lana Morris (born Averil Maureen Anita Morris; 1930–1998), British film, stage and television actress
 Lelia N. Morris (Mrs. Charles H. Morris, 1862–1929), American hymn writer
 Lily Morris (born Lilles Mary Crosby; 1882–1952), English comedic music hall performer
 Linda Morris, American television producer and writer
 Mali Morris (born 1945), British artist
 Marcus Morris (1915–1989), British priest and publisher
 Maren Morris (born 1990), American musician
 Margie Morris (1892–1983), Anglo-Dutch actress
 Marianne Morris (born 1981), Canadian poet
 Marlowe Morris (1915–1978), American jazz pianist and organist
 Maurice Morris (born 1979), American football running back
 May Morris (Mary Morris; 1862–1938), English craftswoman and designer
 Mervyn Morris (born 1937), Jamaican poet
 Mitch Morris (born 1979), American actor
 Montrose Morris (1861–1916), American architect
 Myra Morris (1893–1966), Australian poet and novelist
 Nathan Morris (born 1971), American singer, founding member of the band Boyz II Men
 Oswald Morris (1915–2014), British cinematographer
 Owen Morris (born 1968), British record producer
 Paula Morris (born 1965), New Zealand writer
 Phyllis Morris (furniture designer) (1925–1988), American furniture designer
 R. Winston Morris (born 1941), American tubist
 Rae Morris (born 1992), British singer and songwriter
 Rebecca Morris (born 1969), American abstract painter
 Rebecca Morris (author), American true-crime author
 Reggie Morris (James Reginald Morris; 1886–1928), American actor, director, and screenwriter
 Reginald Owen Morris (1886–1948, better known as R.O. Morris), British composer and teacher
 Rooster Morris, American songwriter, musician and children's writer
 Ruthie Morris (born 1964), musician
 Seth Morris (born 1970), American actor, comedian and writer
 Sharon Morris, Welsh poet
 Shellie Morris, indigenous Australian singer-songwriter
 Sienna Morris (born 1983), American painter
 Siwan Morris (born 1976), Welsh actress
 Talwin Morris (1865–1911), British book designer
 Tess Morris (Tessa Jo Morris; born 1977), British screenwriter
 Tracie Morris, American poet
 W. F. Morris (Walter Frederick Morris; 1892–1975), English novelist
 Wanya Morris (born 1973), American R&B singer and lead of group Boyz II Men
 Wesley Morris (born 1975), American journalist, film critic and podcast host
 Wilber Morris (1937–2002), American jazz double bass player
 Wright Morris (1910–1998), American novelist, photographer, and essayist
 Wyn Morris (1929–2010), Welsh conductor
 Zack Morris (actor) (born 1998), English actor

Education

 John Turner MacGregor-Morris (1872–1959), British engineer, professor of electrical engineering at Queen Mary University of London
 A. J. A. Morris (Andrew James Anthony Morris), British historian
 Benny Morris (born 1948), Israeli historian
 Bonnie J. Morris (born 1961), American women's studies professor
 Charlotte P. Morris, American academic administrator
 Effie Morris (1921–2009), American librarian and educator
 Ivan Morris (1925–1976), British author and teacher in the field of Japanese studies
 Jeremy Morris (born 1960), British historian, Church of England priest
 Joe Hall Morris, American oral surgeon, chairman of the Oral Surgery Department at the University of Tennessee (1966–1988)
 Lawrence Morris, chief of staff and counselor to the president at The Catholic University of America
 Leon Morris (1914–2006), Australian New Testament scholar
 Myron Newton Morris (1810–1885), American educator, politician and Congregationalist minister, principal of Bacon Academy (1837–1838, 1840–1843), member of the Connecticut House of Representatives (1872, 1875)
 Norman Morris (1920–2008), British obstetrician
 Norval Morris (1923–2004), Australian and American law professor, criminologist
 Pamela Morris (1906–2002), English teacher and publisher
 R. O. Morris (Reginald Owen Morris; 1886–1948), British composer and teacher
 Victor Pierpont Morris (1891–1974), professor (1926–1959), dean (1936–1957) and interim president (1953–1954) of the University of Oregon

Politics, law, and government

 Anne Marie Morris (born 1957), British politician, member of the House of Commons (from 2010)
 Augustus Morris (1820–1895), Australian politician, member of the New South Wales Legislative Assembly
 Barry Morris (1935–2001), Australian politician
 Brewster Morris (1909–1990), United States Ambassador to Chad (1963–1967)
 Bruce Morris, American politician, Member of the Connecticut House of Representatives (from 2007)
 Buckner Stith Morris (1800–1879), Mayor of Chicago (1838–1839)
 Basil Morris (1888–1975), Australian general, military administrator of Papua (1942–1946)
 Cadwalader Morris (1741–1795), American merchant and politician, delegate for Pennsylvania in the Continental Congress (1783, 1784)
 Calvary Morris (1798–1871), U.S. Representative from Ohio (1837–1843)
 Claude F. Morris (1869–1957), Justice of the Montana Supreme Court
 Clifford Morris (born 1942), British Labour politician, leader of Bolton Council (2006–2018)
 Corbyn Morris (1710–1779), English commissioner of the customs and economic writer
 Daniel Morris (1812–1889), U.S. Representative
 Deborah Morris (born 1970), member of the New Zealand House of Representatives (1996–1999)
 Dick Morris (born 1948), American political author, newspaper columnist, and commentator
 Earle Morris Jr. (1928–2011), American Democratic politician, Lieutenant-Governor of South Carolina (1971–1975)
 Estelle Morris (born 1952), British politician and member of the House of Lords
 Floyd Morris (born 1969), President of the Senate of Jamaica (2013–2016)
 G. Delbert Morris (1909–1987), American Republican politician, member of the California State Assembly (1948–1956)
 Gouverneur Morris (1752–1816), American statesman, and diplomat
 Grahame Morris (born 1961), British politician, member of the House of Commons of the United Kingdom (from 2010)
 Greta N. Morris, United States Ambassador to the Republic of the Marshall Islands (2003–2006)
 Gwladys Evan Morris (1879–1957), Welsh stage actress and writer
 Harvey R. Morris (1807–1886), New York politician
 Ira Nelson Morris (1883–1942), American diplomat, Minister to Sweden (1914–1923)
 Isaac N. Morris (1812–1879), United States Representative from Illinois (1857–1861)
 J. Clyde Morris (1909–1987), American civil servant, only city manager of City of Warwick, Virginia (1952–1958)
James Morris (born 1967), British politician, member of the House of Commons (from 2010)
 Jay Morris (born 1958), American, businessman, attorney and politician, Republican member of the Louisiana House of Representatives (from 2012)
 Jerry Morris (Jeremiah Noah Morris; 1910–2009), British epidemiologist and cardiologist
 Jill Morris, British Ambassador to Italy (from 2016)
 Kiah Morris (born 1976), Vermont politician
 Kindred Jenkins Morris (1819–1884), American Democratic politician, Mayor of Nashville, Tennessee (1869–1871)
 Kirk Morris (born 1946), Italian bodybuilder and actor
 Leland B. Morris (1886–1950), American diplomat, U.S. Ambassador to Iceland (1942–1944) and to Iran (1944–1945)
 Leslie Morris (1904–1964), Welsh-Canadian politician, general secretary of the Communist Party of Canada (1962–1964)
 Lorenzo Morris (1817–1903), New York politician
 Logan Morris (1889–1977), judge of the United States Board of Tax Appeals
 Luzon B. Morris (1827–1895), American lawyer and politician, 55th Governor of Connecticut (1893–1895)
 Lyndon Henry Morris (1889–1946), Devon chief constable (1931–1946)
 Malcolm Morris (1913–1972), English lawyer
 Mathias Morris (1787–1839), Anti-Jacksonian and Whig member of the U.S. House of Representatives from Pennsylvania
 Milton Morris (1924–2019), Australian politician, Member of the New South Wales Parliament (1956–1980), New South Wales Minister for Transport (1965–1975)
 Mount Etna Morris (1900–1988), American politician, State Treasurer of Missouri (1949–1953, 1957–1961, 1965–1969)
 Naomi E. Morris (1921–1986), American jurist, Chief Judge of the North Carolina Court of Appeals (1978–1982)
 Newbold Morris (1902–1966), American politician, lawyer, president of the New York City Council (1938–1945)
 Oscar Morris (1876–1939), American politician, member of the Wisconsin State Senate (1921–1938)
 Patricia Morris, Baroness Morris of Bolton (born 1954), British peer, Shadow Minister for Women, Opposition Whip for the Conservative Party
 Percy Morris (1893–1967), British railway clerk, trade unionist and politician, member of Parliament (1945–1959)
 Rhys Hopkin Morris (1888–1956), Welsh Liberal politician, Member of Parliament (1923–1932, (1945–1956)
 Rien Morris, Marshallese politician
 Roland S. Morris (1874–1945), U.S. Ambassador to Japan (1917–1920)
 Staats Long Morris (1728–1800), major-general in the British army during the American Revolution, Governor of Quebec (1797–1800)
 Stuart Morris, Australian lawyer, Justice of the Supreme Court of Victoria (2003–2007)
 Tim Morris (Timothy Bryce Morris; born 1955), Australian politician, member of the Tasmanian House of Assembly (2002–2014)
 Toby Morris (politician) (1899–1973), American politician, U.S. Representative from Oklahoma (1947–1953, 1957–1961)
 Timothy Morris (born 1958), British diplomat, ambassador to Morocco and Mauritania (2008–2012), the Democratic Republic of Congo and the Republic of Congo (temporary, 2014–2015), and South Sudan (2015–2017)
 Trefor Morris (born 1934), British law enforcer, Chief Inspector of Constabulary (1993–1996)
 Valentine Morris (1727–1789), British landowner and politician, Governor of St. Vincent (1772–1779)
 Wolfe Morris (born Woolf Steinberg; 1925–1996), English actor
 Owen Temple-Morris (1896–1985), British barrister and Conservative politician, member of Parliament (1931–1942)

Sciences

 Adele Morris (born 1963), policy director for Climate and Energy Economics at the Brookings Institution
 Aldon Morris (born 1949), American sociologist
 Barbara Morris (1918–2009), English art scholar and artist
 Bede Morris (1927–1988), Australian immunologist
 Bevan Morris (born 1949), American psychologist and philosopher, president of Maharishi University of Management (1980–2016)
 Christine Ballengee-Morris, professor in the Arts Administration, Education and Policy Department for Ohio State University
 Cynthia Taft Morris (1928–2013), American economist
 Sir Daniel Morris (1844–1933), British botanist
 Desmond Morris (born 1928), British ethnologist and zoologist
 Gareth A. Morris (born 1954), British chemist
 Hamilton Morris (born 1987), American writer, documentarian, and psychoactive drug researcher
 Hannah Morris, American anthropologist, member of the Underground Astronauts group
 Howard Morris (biochemist), British biochemist
 Joy Morris (born 1970), Canadian mathematician
 Julian Morris (economist), British and American economist, Vice President of Research at Reason Foundation
 Kirsten Morris (born 1960), Canadian applied mathematician
 Malcolm Morris (dermatologist) (1849–1924), British surgeon and dermatologist, first president of the British Association of Dermatologists (1920–1921), chairman of the London Radium Institute (1923–1925)
 Margaretta Morris (1797–1867), American entomologist
 Meaghan Morris (born 1950), Australian scholar of cultural studies
 Molly R. Morris, American behavioral ecologist
 Nigel Goring-Morris, British and Israeli archaeologist
 Ralph Camroux Morris (1895–1977), British Indian hunter-naturalist and politician
 Rosa M. Morris (1914-2011), British applied mathematician
 Ruth Morris (1933–2001), Canadian sociologist, penologist and prison abolitionist
 Rona Moss-Morris, British psychologist
 S. Brent Morris, American mathematician, freemasonic historian
 Tessa Morris-Suzuki (née Tessa Morris; born 1951), British historian

Sports

A. J. Morris (born 1986), American baseball pitcher
Aggrey Morris (born 1984), Tanzanian footballer
Akeel Morris (born 1992), American baseball pitcher
Alec Morris, New Zealand rugby league footballer
Alessandro Morris (born 1982), Caymanian cricketer
Alwyn Morris (born 1957), Canadian Olympic sprint kayaker
Aric Morris (born 1977), American football safety
Barney Morris (1915–1962), baseball player in the Negro leagues
Bernard Morris (born 1985), American football quarterback
Bernie Morris (Bernard Patrick Morris; 1890–1963), Canadian ice hockey player
Brennan Morris (born 1990), American swimmer
Brett Morris (born 1986), Australian rugby league footballer
Bryn Morris (born 1996), English footballer
Buckshot Morris, American car racer and race car owner
Butler Morris, Papua New Guinean rugby league player
Cale Morris, (born 1996), American ice hockey goaltender
Callum Morris (born 1990), English footballer
Carolyn Morris (1925–1996), American baseball pitcher
Carlton Morris (born 1995), English footballer
Cavour Morris (born 1932), Barbadian sports shooter
Catherine Morris, British figure skater
Cecil Morris (born c. 1934), American football coach and player
Chad Morris (born 1968), American football coach
Christie Morris (Charles Christopher Morris; 1882–1971), American cricketer
Cody Morris (born 1996), American baseball player
Dai Morris (William David Morris; born 1941), Welsh rugby union footballer
Dale Morris (born 1982), Australian rules footballer
Danny Morris (born 1949), American baseball pitcher for the Minnesota Twins
Darren Morris (born 1974), Wales rugby union player
Darrin Morris (1966–2000), American super middleweight boxer
Darick Kobie Morris (born 1995), Croatian footballer
Darius Morris (born 1991), American basketball player
Dennit Morris (1936–2014), American football linebacker
Des Morris (born 1948), Australian rugby league footballer, coach and administrator
Desmond Morris (athlete) (1961–1989), Jamaican Olympic high jumper
Devon Morris (born 1961), Jamaican sprinter
Dewi Morris (born 1964), English rugby union footballer
Dov Grumet-Morris (born 1982), American ice hockey player
Doyt Morris (1916–1984), American baseball outfielder
Earl H. Morris, American archeologist
Earl Morris (basketball coach) (born 1933), American high school basketball coach
Earle Morris (born 1945), Canadian curler
Edgar Morris (1914–2002), Rhodesian cricket player
Elfed Morris (1942–2013), Welsh footballer
Elliot Morris (rugby league) (born 1996), English rugby league footballer
Elwyn Morris (also known as Moe Morris; 1921–2000), Canadian ice hockey player
Finlay Morris (1945–1967), Scottish professional golfer
Frazer Morris (born 1997), British rugby league player
Gavin Morris (born 1998), South African cricketer
George H. Morris (born 1938), American equestrian
Glenn Morris (1912–1974), American Olympic track and field athlete
Glenn Morris (footballer) (born 1983), English football goalkeeper
Graeme Morris (cricketer) (born 1963), English cricketer
Grenville Morris (1877–1959), Welsh footballer
Hampton Morris (born 2004), American weightlifter
Haydn Morris (born 1928), British rugby union wing
Isaiah Morris (born 1969), American basketball player
Jake Morris (soccer) (born 1999), American soccer defender for the Seattle Sounders FC 2
Jake Morris (hurler), Irish hurler
Jamel Morris (born 1992), American basketball player
Jason Morris (born 1967), American Olympic judoka
Jaylen Morris (born 1995), American basketball player for the Milwaukee Bucks
Jené Morris (born 1987), American basketball player
Jody Morris, English football player
Jontavius Morris (born 1993), American football defensive tackle and coach
Julius Morris (born 1994), Montserratian sprinter
Hal Morris (born 1965), baseball player
Hunter Morris (born 1988), American baseball first baseman
Kelvin Morris (born 1982), American football linebacker
Kieran Morris (born 1990), Irish hurler
Kieron Morris (born 1994), English footballer playing for Walsall
L. N. Morris, American football coach, head coach at Lehigh University
Larry Morris (1933–2012), American football linebacker
Larry Morris (running back) (born 1962), American football player
Leonard Morris (cricketer) (1898–1984), English cricketer
Lester Morris, Saint Kitts and Nevis football manager
Lisa Newman-Morris (born 1971), Australian trampoline gymnast
Luismel Morris (Luismel Morris Calero; born 1997), Cuban football player
Luke Morris (born 1988), English jockey
Maesmore Morris (1868–1917), Australian cricketer
Marcus Morris (born 1989), American basketball player
Markieff Morris (born 1989), American basketball player
Max Morris (1925–1998), American basketball and American football player
Meg Morris (born 1992), American soccer player
Mercury Morris, American football player
Monté Morris (born 1995), American basketball player for the Denver Nuggets
Morgan Morris (born 1998), Welsh rugby union player for Ospreys
Mouse Morris (Michael Morris; born 1951), Irish racehorse trainer and jockey
Nasief Morris (born 1981), South African footballer
Neil Morris (born 1970), English footballer
Noel Morris (born 1975), Irish hurler
Norman Morris (English cricketer) (1849–1874)
Norman Morris (Australian cricketer) (1907–1982)
Oliver Morris (1916–1944), Welsh rugby union and rugby league footballer
P. Morris (Sussex cricketer), 19th-century first-class cricketer
P. J. Morris, 20th-century first-class cricketer
Percy Morris (cricketer) (1881–1975), Welsh cricketer
Quintin Morris (born 1999), American football player
R. Morris (footballer) (c. 1864 – ?), English footballer who played for Everton
Rachel Morris (cyclist) (born 1979), British Paralympic cyclist and rower
Raheem Morris, American football coach
Randall Morris (born 1961), American football running back
Randolph Morris (born 1986), American basketball player for the Beijing Ducks of the Chinese Basketball Association
Ray Morris (1908–1933), Australian rugby league footballer
Robin Morris (born 1976), Indian cricketer
Rod Morris (born 1950), Australian rugby league footballer
Rodney Morris (born 1970), American pool player
Rosemary Morris (also known as Rosie Morris; born 1986), British Olympic water polo player
Ruth Morris (athlete) (born 1962), United States Virgin Islands Olympic sprinter
Sandi Morris (born 1992), American pole vaulter
Sean Morris (cricketer) (born 1968), English cricketer who played for the Hampshire County club
Sean Morris (born 1982), American lacrosse player
Seb Morris (Sebastian Morris; born 1995), British racing driver
Seymour Morris (1913–1991), Welsh football outside left
Sian Morris (born 1965), Welsh sprinter
Sion Morris (born 1977), Welsh cricketer who played for the Wales Minor Counties club
Shane Morris (born 1994), American football quarterback
Shaquille Morris (born 1994), American basketball player for the San-en NeoPhoenix
Solomon Morris (born 1990), Sierra Leonean footballer
Stan Morris (1893–1948), Australian rules footballer who played for the Richmond club
Stephon Morris (born 1991), American football cornerback
Stewart Morris (1909–1991), British Olympic sailor
Sue Morris (born 1958), New Zealand cricketer
Sylvester Morris (born 1977), American football wide receiver
Tashreeq Morris (born 1994), South African footballer
Taylor Morris (luger) (born 1991), American Olympic luger
Teddy Morris (Allan Byron Morris; 1910–1965), Canadian rules football player
Terence Morris (born 1979) American NBA and Israel Basketball Premier League basketball player
Tracey Morris (born 1967), British long-distance runner
Una Morris (born 1947), Jamaican sprinter
Vernon Morris (1900–1973), Welsh cricketer who played for the Glamorgan County club
Victor Morris (born 1985), American basketball player
Violette Morris (1893–1944), French Olympic athlete
Walter Morris (John Walter Morris; 1880–1961), American baseball player
Warren Morris (born 1974), American Olympic baseball player
Whiz Morris (Harold Marsh Morris; 1898–1984), English cricketer
Zac Morris (born 1978), English cricketer

Other

 Leslie Dalton-Morris (1906–1976), senior Royal Air Force commander
 Agnes Thomas Morris (1865–1949), American writer and clubwoman
 Alice Vanderbilt Morris (1874–1950), member of the Vanderbilt family, co-founder of the International Auxiliary Language Association
 Augustus Newbold Morris (1838–1906), American socialite
 Barry S. Morris, CEO of NuoDB
 Ben Morris (special effects artist), Best Visual Effects Academy Award winner for The Golden Compass (2007)
 Christine Wigfall Morris (1922–2014), American librarian
 Claud Morris (1920–2000), British newspaper owner
 Clayton Morris (born 1976), American real estate investor and television host
 Cory Morris (born 1978), American serial killer and necrophile
 Dontae Morris (born 1985), American convicted serial killer sentenced to the death penalty
 Doug Morris (born 1938), chairman and CEO of the Universal Music Group (1995–2011) and Sony Music Entertainment (2011–2017)
 Douglas Morris (1908–1990), Air Officer Commanding-in-Chief of Royal Air Force Fighter Command (1962–1966)
 Ernest William Morris (died 1937), secretary and house governor of The London Hospital (1903–1930)
 Esther Morris Leidolf, medical sociologist, and intersex activist
 Eva Morris (1885–2000), British supercentenarian, oldest recognised person in the world (1999–2000)
 Evan Morris (1977–2015), American lobbyist for Genentech and Roche
 G. Scott Morris (born 1954), American medical doctor and ordained minister in the United Methodist Church
 Gideon Morris (1756–1798), trans-Appalachian pioneer and founder of Morristown, Tennessee
 Gouverneur Morris Jr. (1813–1888), American railroad executive
 Graeme Morris (game designer), British RPG designer
 H. G. Morris, acting Commander of the Ceylon Volunteers Force (1902)
 Jane Morris (née Jane Burden, 1839–1914), English artists' model, and embroiderer
 Jasper Morris, British wine expert
 Jerod Morris, founder and managing editor of the Midwest Sports Fans blog
 Juliet Morris (born 1965), British television presenter
 Kathleen Tacchi-Morris (1899–1993), British anti-war activist, founder of Women for World Disarmament
 Kellyn Morris (born 1989), Australian television presenter
 Kylie Morris, Australian and British journalist
 Layne Morris (born 1962), American Special Forces soldier
 Melvin Morris (born 1942), American Special Forces Soldier, Vietnam War veteran, Medal of Honor recipient
 Nancy Morris (born 1961), Reform rabbi of Glasgow Reform Synagogue
 Natali Morris (née Natali Del Conte; born 1978), American technology news journalist
 Nate Morris (born 1980), American entrepreneur, co-founder and CEO of the recycling company Rubicon Global
 Nathan Morris (evangelist) (born 1979), British and American evangelist, leader of the Bay Revival
 Nelson Morris (1838–1907), American meatpacker
 Neva Morris (1895–2010), American supercentenarian
 Nigel Morris (born 1958), British businessman, co-founder of Capital One Financial Services
 Nizah Morris (1955–2002), American transgender entertainer
 Olive Morris (1952–1979), British civil rights activist
 Patricia "Patsy" Morris (1966-1980), murdered British child
 R. Scott Morris, American financial engineer
 Rachel Morris, English psychotherapist and counsellor
 Roy Morris ( – 2011), British Scout Leader, recipient of the Silver Wolf Award
 Rupert Morris (1843–1918), Welsh clergyman and antiquarian
 Stuyvesant Fish Morris (1843–1928), American physician
 Tim Morris (priest) (Timothy David Morris), Dean of Edinburgh (1992–2001)
 Victor Vaughen Morris (1873–1929), American and Peruvian businessman and bar owner, inventor of pisco sour cocktail
 Walter F. Morris Jr., American cultural preservationist

Characters
Archie Morris, a character in the television series ER
Christine Morris, a character in the television series Christine Morris series
Dinah Morris, a character in George Eliot's novel Adam Bede (1859)
Lou Anthony Morris, a character in the British television series Friday night dinner
Mr. Morris, a character in the television series Arthur
Nikki Morris, a character in the 2004 video game Need for Speed: Underground 2, portrayed by Kelly Brook
Quincey Morris, a character in Bram Stoker's horror novel Dracula (1897)
Zack Morris, a character in the sitcoms Good Morning, Miss Bliss; Saved by the Bell, and Saved by the Bell: The College Years

See also
Morris (given name)
Morris family (disambiguation)
Morriss, surname
Maurice (disambiguation)
Morrice

Notes

English-language surnames
Anglicised Welsh-language surnames
Americanized surnames